Silvina Moschini (born 1972) is an Argentine entrepreneur. As a businesswoman, she is the founder of Yandiki, SheWorks!, and Intuic and the president of KMGi Group. As an analyst of Internet trends, she appears on networks including CNN en Español and Nuestra Tele Noticias 24 Horas.

Early life and education
Moschini was born in Azul, Argentina. She holds a BA in Public Relations Universidad Argentina de la Empresa (Buenos Aires, Argentina), a degree in Marketing from New York University, and a Masters in Public Relations from the University of Houston, Texas. She had further studies were in Management and Social Networking Web Communications at the Libera Università di Lingue e Comunicazione and at the Università Commerciale Luigi Bocconi, both in Milan, Italy.

Business career

Intuic
Moschini then obtained a position to lead the Latin American Public Relations department of Compaq, which was later acquired by Hewlett-Packard. She held positions at Patagon.com and Grupo Santander Central Hispano before becoming vice president of corporate communications for Visa International. She left to found her own company in 2003, a public relations firm focusing on brand visibility called Intuic. Her clientele included companies like Microsoft, Google, Energizer, the New York Post, and Siemens, among others. Moschini is the CEO of Intuic. In 2020 the company was relaunched in order to specifically focus on women employees in digital work.

KMGi Group
Moschini is also president of KMGi Group, president of WikiExperts.us, and president of TransparentBusiness. In 2020, because of Moschini’s direction, the company became referred to as a “pink unicorn” as it was given a billion dollar valuation.

Yandiki
In 2014 Moschini founded the employment platform Yandiki, which provides a pool of workers in various fields for companies to select for freelance work. Early clients for the company included the Inter-American Development Bank, Sony, and Cable & Wireless. The initial target of the platform was millennial workers seeking to work online, and in 2015 it became a partner of the Facebook Start platform, adding other employers to the platform including Twitter and Google. The Yandiki platform includes filtering features for things like skills, cost, and past work ratings, in addition to functions for online tests that are customizable for different skills and video interviews. That year Moschini joined Endeavor.org through Endeavor Miami.

SheWorks!
In 2017 Moschini founded SheWorks!, a platform for connecting women to employers online in order to provide flexible job opportunities for women, including those on the fringes of the job market or those looking to re-enter the workforce. It utilizes the cloud in order to provide remote work. The platform is free for women and includes educational tools for entrepreneurs as well as digital skills improvement. Originally serving mostly Eastern Europe and Latin America with fewer users in other parts of the world, as of 2019 there were twenty thousand women registered for SheWorks! living in 65 different countries. In 2018 Moschini was invited to be a part of the W20 Summit in Argentina for her work with the platform. She has also founded local versions of the site, including EllasTrabajan! Argentina. In 2019 she was named to City & States'''s Women of New York Business list.

Media

Moschini has worked as an advocate for economic empowerment of women through technology and has commentated and written on the subject of the digital transition for work. She was named a LinkedIn Influencer in 2019 by LinkedIn.

Commentating
She has appeared on CNN en Español and Nuestra Tele Noticias 24 Horas (NTN24) as an expert in online trends, including Pinterest, Facebook, and Wikipedia. She has been consulted about issues such as "Cyber Monday" in the U.S., using Blackberry during the London riots of August 2011, growth of the social network Twitter, and the social impact that meant the death of Steve Jobs. She has appeared on the programs Dinero, Clix, and Directo USA where she hosts the weekly segment Directo a la Tecnologia.

Writing
She is also a columnist for the Spanish newspaper La Vanguardia, where she writes about marketing and publicity on the Internet, as well as for Voxxi, El Universal, and Thrive Global. Moschini has stated that the Wikimedia Foundation should sell advertising on Wikipedia, saying "They should think of advertising not as intrusion but as a way of funding not only servers but also improved academic content."

Speaking
Moschini has also spoken at conferences, such as the 6th GINxti National Congress, Facebook F8, and 500 Startups Unity + Inclusion Summit. In 2019, Moschini was invited by the US State Department to speak at the Global Entrepreneurship Summit.

Unicorn Hunters
In April 2021, she became a panelist for the new TV series Unicorn Hunters, a business investment show from the makers of the series The Masked Singer''.

Personal life
Moschini is married to fellow web entrepreneur Alex Konanykhin. In 2019 she received the Equals in Tech Award, and in 2020 she received the Women in Tech Lifetime Achievement Award.

References

1972 births
Living people
Argentine business writers
Argentine business theorists
Business speakers
Marketing speakers
Marketing women
Argentine women in business
Women business writers